Drillia euchroes is a species of sea snail, a marine gastropod mollusc in the family Drilliidae.

Description

The length of the shell attains 16 mm, its diameter 4.5 mm.

A. brightly coloured species, in shape attenuate-fusiform. The shell contains 11 whorls, with a small, vitreous, bulbous protoconch. The remainder is suturally considerably impressed. The shell is straw-coloured with closely ranged spiral lirae of dark chestnut alternating with ochreous. In the centre of each whorl is a white spiral band, bringing into prominence the strongly modiiled ribs of the angle of the whorl. The aperture is oblong. The outer lip is thin.

Distribution
This marine species occurs in the Persian Gulf.

References

  Tucker, J.K. 2004 Catalog of recent and fossil turrids (Mollusca: Gastropoda). Zootaxa 682:1-1295

External links
 

euchroes
Marine animals
Gastropods described in 1912